The history of the Jews in Pakistan dates at least as far back as 1839, when Pakistan was a part of British India. Various estimates suggest that there were about 1,000 to 2,500 Jews living in Karachi at the beginning of the 20th century, mostly comprising Iranian Jews and Bene Israel (Indian Jews); a substantial Jewish community lived in Rawalpindi, and a smaller community also lived in Peshawar.

The Partition of British India along religious lines in August 1947 led to the establishment of two independent sovereign states: a Hindu-majority India and a Muslim-majority Pakistan. Following this event, Pakistani Jews began to leave the new country for India, Canada and the United States before their persecution heightened in Pakistan after the establishment of Israel in 1948, which ultimately led to their exodus from the country; today, Pakistan-origin Jews are predominantly found in the Israeli city of Ramla (see Pakistani Jews in Israel), while the Pakistani government claims to host a modest Jewish population. According to Pakistan's National Database and Registration Authority (NADRA), there are 745 registered Jewish families in the country. However, the accuracy and transparency of the NDRA's database has been challenged; Liel Leibovitz, an Israeli journalist, has doubted the correctness of the official numbers.

It has been widely reported in Pakistani media that a man known as Fishel Benkhald, who preserves the last standing Jewish cemetery in Karachi, has claimed to be last Jew in Pakistan. However, Benkhald's identity has been challenged by his brothers, who claim to be Muslims, and he has been targeted and attacked in the country due to his activism for religious minorities in Pakistan. However, his Jewishness was formally recognized by the Pakistani government in 2017 after numerous appeals.

History

First migrations
A community of Jews fleeing a revolt in Mashhad, Persia, settled in Rawalpindi in the Punjab in 1839.  The elaborate early 20th century synagogue they built still stands on Nishtar Street in Rawalpindi's Babu Mohallah neighborhood, between the Bohra Mosque and a large and elaborate Victorian era church.

Colonial era (1842-1947) 
According to the 1881 census, there were 153 Jews in Sindh province. In the Sindh Gazetteer of 1907, Edward Hamilton Aitken mentions that according to the 1901 census, the total population of Jews [in Sindh] was 482 and almost all of them lived in Karachi. By 1919, this figure had risen to about 650. By 1947, there were about 1,500 Jews living in Sindh with the majority residing in Karachi. Most of these Jews were Bene Israel and they lived as tradesmen, artisans, poets, philosophers and civil servants.

In 1911, Jews constituted 0.3 percent of Karachi's population and at the time of independence from the British Empire their number had reached 2,500. In her 1947 book ‘Malika-e-Mashriq’ (Queen of the East), Mehmooda Rizwiya has written about the Jewish presence in Karachi. Jews used to live in Karachi. In a paper titled "Karachi Ke Yahudi” (Karachi's Jews), Gul Hasan Kalmatti indicates that Jews arrived in Karachi from Maharashtra in the 19th century.

A variety of associations existed to serve the Jewish community in Pakistan, including:

Magain Shalome Synagogue: Built in 1893 near Ranchore Line, by Solomon David Umerdekar and his son Gershone Solomon. Other accounts suggest that it was built by Shalom Solomon, a surveyor for the Karachi Municipal Committee and his wife Shegula-bai. The synagogue soon became the center of a small but vibrant Jewish community. A member of this Synagogue, Abraham Reuben Kamarlekar, became a councilor in the Karachi City Corporation in 1936.
 Young Man's Jewish Association: Founded in 1903 and whose aim was to encourage sports as well as religious and social activities of the Bene Israel in Karachi.
 Karachi Bene Israel Relief Fund: Established to support poor Jews in Karachi.
 Karachi Jewish Syndicate: Formed in 1918 and whose aim was to provide homes to poor Jews at reasonable rent fees.

Post-independence

1947-1970
Leading up to the time of the Partition of India, some 1300 Jews remained in Karachi, most of them Bene Israel Jews observing Sephardic Jewish rites. The first real exodus of Jewish refugees from British India to Bombay and other cities in India came just prior to the creation of Israel in 1948 when antisemitism spread to Pakistan. When Israel came into being in 1948, many Jews migrated to Israel, and after the Arab-Israel war a majority of them left Karachi. By 1953, fewer than 500 Jews were reported to be in all of Pakistan.

1971–present
Magen Shalom, the Bene Israel's only synagogue in Karachi founded under the British Raj, was demolished in 1988 to make way for a shopping plaza by order of General Zia-ul-Haq shortly after the Bene Israel community in Israel petitioned for its maintenance and use as a historical or other community center. As per another account, in July 1988 the synagogue was burnt and brought down by religious zealots (where today a building 'Madiha Square' stands). The last custodian of the synagogue was Rachel Joseph, now deceased. Many Jews who migrated from Pakistan have not updated their status since leaving Pakistan in NADRA's database so the database must be old and there may not actually be as many Jewish Pakistanis left in Pakistan despite NADRA showing existence of Jews in Pakistan.

Dan Kiesel, a Jew of German origin, was employed as a physiotherapist by the Pakistan Cricket Board from 1995 to 1999. His appointment brought some controversy, as Pakistani politicians questioned the hiring an Israeli Jew in the Senate of Pakistan.

The term "Yehudi" and its variants remains a word of derision when directed at a Bene Israel or anyone else as noted by Reverend John Wilson, one of the founders of University of Bombay (now University of Mumbai). In Urdu and Hindi, however, the word simply translates to Jewish. The Bene Israel's prayers include intercessions on behalf of Her Majesty as in several Commonwealth countries. The Jewish Chronicle of London reported on Karachi's Jews as recently as 2007.

In general elections 2013, it was reported that 809 adult Jews were enrolled as voters. The number of Jewish women voters was 427 against 382 men in the community. By 2017, according to the Election Commission of Pakistan around 900 Jews were registered as voters in the country. Also in 2017 According to the National Database and Registration Authority, there are 745 registered Jewish families in Pakistan.

Most of the Karachi Jews now live in Ramla, Israel, Mumbai, India and Toronto, Ontario, Canada with several spread throughout the United States of America and built a synagogue they named Magen Shalome after the Pakistani Synagogue in Ramla. Developments in the Middle East peace process led to an alleged visit of Pakistan's government's representative's visit to Israel. While, the government denies any such visit to Israel a new controversy broke out when a former minister said that he visited Israel during Nawaz Sharif's tenure as PM.

Notable people
 Moses Somake, architect

Lifestyle
Bene Israel maintain Sephardic Jewish rites as modified by several cross-cultural celebrations based on their current locations in the world.

Antisemitism

Many purport to speak about the state of antisemitism in Pakistan today and in her past.  The massive demographic influx of Mohajirs from the Dominion of India upon independence and the creation of Israel and the consequent Arab–Israeli conflict worsened Jew-hatred as witnessed by the 1948 Muslim occupation and eventual destruction of Karachi's Magane Shalom synagogue.  After the 1970s, anti-Semitism worsened towards the Jews of Pakistan.

Mewa Shah Graveyard
The Jewish Bene Israel Graveyard remains in the larger Mewa Shah Graveyard in Karachi.

Further reading
 "The Jews of Pakistan-A forgotten heritage", Yoel Reuben (Satamkar), Bene Israel heritage museum and genealogical research centre, 2010
 "So, what's your Kar-A journey into unknown India & Pakistan", Eliaz Reuben-Dandeker, Kammodan Mocadem Publishing house, 2018
 "The guide for the Bene Israel of India-culture, history and customs", Eliaz Reuben-Dandeker, Kammodan Mocadem Publishing house, 2019
 "The Jammaat-Inspiring people of the Bene Israel of India community, Eliaz Reuben-Dandeker, Kammodan Mocadem Publishing house, 2020
 Bene Israel graveyard: buried in time or conscience?, Dawn News
 In search of Jews in Karachi, Express Tribune
 When Jews found refuge in an unlikely place: Pakistan, Haretz
 The Jews of Pakistan, Daily Times

See also

 Pakistani Jews in Israel
Antisemitism in Pakistan 
 Religion in Pakistan

References

Sources
Above material is based on an article of Prof. Adil Najam of Fletcher School of Law and Diplomacy, Tufts University, published in Pakistan's newspaper The Daily Times. 1

 
Jews and Judaism in Pakistan
 
Pakistan
Jews
Jews
Israel–Pakistan relations
History of the foreign relations of Pakistan